Santa Rosa is a census-designated place (CDP) in Starr County, Texas, United States. It is a new CDP for 2010 census with a population of 241. It was formed along with El Chaparral CDP from the old Santa Cruz CDP. (Not to confused with the new Santa Cruz CDP.)

Geography
Santa Rosa is located at  (26.348732, -98.769912).

Education
It is in the Rio Grande City Grulla Independent School District (formerly Rio Grande City Consolidated Independent School District)

References

Census-designated places in Starr County, Texas
Census-designated places in Texas